RBK-500 is a Russian 500 kg cluster bomb. It carries 15 "Motiv-3" SPBE-D antitank submunitions developed by NPO Bazalt with dual-mode infrared homing system. It entered service with the Soviet Air Force in 1987.

References

Cluster munition
Aerial bombs of Russia